South Korea (IOC designation:Korea) participated in the 1958 Asian Games held in Tokyo, Japan from May 24, 1958, to June 1, 1958.

Medal summary

Medal table

Medalists

Participation details

References

Korea, South
1958
Asian Games